World Chocolate Day, sometimes referred to as International Chocolate Day, or just Chocolate Day, is an annual celebration of chocolate, occurring globally on July 7, which some suggest to be the anniversary of the introduction of chocolate to Europe in 1550. The observance of World Chocolate Day dates back to 2009.

Other Chocolate Day celebrations exist, such as National Chocolate Day in the United States on 28 October. The U.S. National Confectioners Association lists 13 September as International Chocolate Day, coinciding with the birth date of Milton S. Hershey (September 13, 1857). Ghana, the second largest producer of cocoa, celebrates Chocolate Day on February 14. In Latvia, World Chocolate Day is celebrated on July 11.

The U.S. National Confectioners Association lists four primary chocolate holidays on their calendar (Chocolate Day (July 7), two National Chocolate Days (October 28 and December 28), and International Chocolate Day (September 13)), in addition to variants such as National Milk Chocolate Day, National White Chocolate Day, and National Cocoa Day.

See also

 List of food days

References

Chocolate events
July observances
Observances about food and drink